Awakino River may refer to several Rivers in New Zealand:

 Awakino River (Waikato), a tributary of the Tasman Sea
 Awakino River (Northland), a tributary of the Wairoa River
 Awakino River (Canterbury), a tributary of the Waitaki River; see rivers of New Zealand
 Awakino River East Branch, a tributary of the Awakino River in the Canterbury region; see Little Awakino River
 Awakino River West Branch, a tributary of the Awakino River in the Canterbury region; see Little Awakino River
 Little Awakino River, a tributary of the Waitaki River